Southern Technical College is a private for-profit technical college with multiple locations in Florida. It was founded in 2001 and provides diploma and associate degree programs.

Locations 
Southern Technical College has campuses in the following cities:
Auburndale 
Brandon 
Fort Myers 
Orlando 
Port Charlotte
Sanford 
Tampa

Accreditation and memberships 
Southern Tech is a member of the Florida Association of Postsecondary Schools and Colleges (FAPSC).

Southern Technical College is licensed by the Commission for Independent Education, Florida Department of Education.

Southern Technical College – Fort Myers, Port Charlotte, and Tampa campuses are accredited by the Accrediting Council for Independent Colleges and Schools to award bachelor's degrees, Associate degrees, and diplomas.

Southern Technical College – Orlando, Auburndale, Brandon, and Sanford campuses are accredited by the Accrediting Commission of Career Schools and Colleges to award associate degrees and diplomas.

References 

Private universities and colleges in Florida
Educational institutions established in 2001
2001 establishments in Florida
Colleges accredited by the Accrediting Council for Independent Colleges and Schools
Sanford, Florida
Mount Dora, Florida